Elizabeth Gordon Ford (born 16 May 1957) is a South African former professional tennis player.

Gordon featured twice in the singles second round at Wimbledon and won a WTA Tour doubles title in 1982 at the German Open (with Beverly Mould). She is married to cricket coach Graham Ford.

WTA Tour finals

Doubles (1–0)

References

External links
 
 

1957 births
Living people
South African female tennis players